Kingscote  may refer to:

Places
 Kingscote, South Australia, a town
Kingscote Airport, airport on Kangaroo Island, South Australia
 Kingscote, Gloucestershire, England
 Kingscote railway station, Sussex, England

Other uses
 Kingscote (surname), a surname
 Kingscote (mansion) in Newport, Rhode Island, United States
 Kingscote Park, Blackpool, a park in Blackpool, England
 Kingscote Park (Gloucestershire), a house near Tetbury, England
 Kingscote School for Girls, fictional school where Antonia Forest's Marlow family are educated